Yugur language may refer to:

 Western Yugur language
 Eastern Yugur language